Doba is a city in Chad,  the capital of the region of Logone Oriental.

Exploitation of oil resources in the vicinity of Doba is expected to produce economic benefits.

The town is served by Doba Airport.

Demographics

Notable people
Grace Kodindo (born 1960) - obstetrician

References

Logone Oriental Region
Populated places in Chad